Ineke Lambers-Hacquebard (12 March 1946 in Deventer – 12 May 2014 in Roden) was a Dutch politician. She was a member of D66 and State Secretary (Netherlands) of Public Health and Environmental Hygiene in the Second Van Agt cabinet and the Third Van Agt cabinet.

She became a Commander of Order of Orange-Nassau in 1982.
She died in 2014.

See also

List of Dutch politicians

References

1946 births
2014 deaths
Members of the House of Representatives (Netherlands)
People from Deventer
Democrats 66 politicians
State Secretaries for Health of the Netherlands